João André Castro Moreira (born 22 April 1988), known as Moreira, is a Portuguese footballer who plays for Pevidém as a forward.

References

1988 births
Living people
Sportspeople from Guimarães
Portuguese footballers
Association football forwards
Varzim S.C. players
C.D. Trofense players
G.D. Joane players
F.C. Vizela players
F.C. Felgueiras 1932 players
Vilaverdense F.C. players

F.C. Tirsense players
Clube Caçadores das Taipas players
Pevidém S.C. players
Liga Portugal 2 players